Kiss Me, Kate is a 1949 album of songs from the musical of the same name recorded by American singer Jo Stafford and actor and singer Gordon Macrae. It was released January 1, 1949 on Columbia Records. In its record review column, Saturday Review called it the best album of the show's songs outside the original cast album.

Track listing

All songs written by Cole Porter
 "Wunderbar" – 2:48
 "Too Darn Hot"
 "Were Thine That Special Face"
 "I Hate Men"
 "Always True to You in My Fashion"
 "Bianca"
 "So in Love"
 "Why Can't You Behave?"

References

External links
Kiss Me, Kate at CMT.com

1949 albums
Jo Stafford albums
Gordon MacRae albums
Columbia Records albums
Vocal duet albums